Taungtha or Thaungtha is a town in the Mandalay Division of central Myanmar. It located south-west of the volcanic cone Mount Taungtha (1788 ft) and above the right (east) bank of the Sindewa (Sintewa) River.There are six quarters in Taungtha township. Taungtha is the administrative seat for Taungtha Township, and is on both the Taunggyi–Myingyan railway and the Meiktila–Myingyan highway. It is also on the Western Trunk Road from Kyaukpadaung to Natogyi.

Economics
Taungtha is in the cotton growing area of Burma and the China World Best Group completed a garment factory there in 2006. The main occupation of Taungtha is growing onion in the bank of Sintelwa. Besides, there also have been cultivation of varieties of bean, corn, etc.
(ref: Record of Taungtha Township.)

Notes

External links
"Taungtha Area, Mandalay Division" map ID: MIMU536v01, creation date: 18 August 2010, Myanmar Information Management Unit (MIMU)
Satellite map at Maplandia.com

Populated places in Mandalay Region
Township capitals of Myanmar